Andrew Dean East (born September 17, 1991) is a former American football long snapper.  He played college football at Vanderbilt, and has also had multiple stints with various NFL teams, most recently the Washington Redskins.

High school career 
East was named a captain of the North Central High School football team in Indianapolis, Indiana. He was a three-year starter on defense and special teams for the 5A division school in the Indianapolis area.

When East was a sophomore and junior, he started at the linebacker position, posting 110 tackles as a junior. He was named the All-Around-Area linebacker while starting as a long-snapper.

As a senior, East contributed 64 tackles and seven quarterback sacks as a first-year starter. He also received the Indiana Academic All-State honors award.

Professional career

Kansas City Chiefs
He signed with the Kansas City Chiefs as an undrafted free agent on May 11, 2015. He was released by the Chiefs on August 30, 2015.

Seattle Seahawks
East signed a reserve/future contract with the Seattle Seahawks on January 4, 2016. He was waived on March 24, 2016.

Oakland Raiders
East was signed by the Oakland Raiders on April 5, 2016. He was waived by the team on August 29, 2016.

Los Angeles Rams
On March 13, 2017, East signed with the Los Angeles Rams. On May 3, 2017, he was waived by the Rams.

Oakland Raiders (second stint)
On July 28, 2017, East was signed by the Raiders. He was waived on September 2, 2017. He signed a reserve/future contract with the Raiders on January 19, 2018. He was waived by the Raiders on April 9, 2018.

Jacksonville Jaguars
On June 14, 2018, East signed with the Jacksonville Jaguars. He was waived on July 31, 2018.

Memphis Express 
On November 9, 2018, East was allocated to the Memphis Express.

Washington Redskins
On December 15, 2018, East was signed by the Washington Redskins after long snapper Nick Sundberg was placed on injured reserve due to a back injury. He was waived on August 2, 2019.

He announced his retirement in a video on his family’s YouTube channel on February 25, 2022.

Personal life
East is married to Olympic gymnast and gold medalist Shawn Johnson. East and Johnson were engaged on July 24, 2015, at Wrigley Field during a Chicago Cubs game, and were married on April 16, 2016, in Franklin, Tennessee. The couple live in Nashville, Tennessee. They have two children, a daughter who was born in October 2019 and a son who was born in July 2021.

East competed on season 13 and 14 of American Ninja Warrior.

References

External links
Vanderbilt Commodores bio

Living people
1991 births
Players of American football from Indianapolis
American football long snappers
Vanderbilt Commodores football players
Kansas City Chiefs players
Seattle Seahawks players
Los Angeles Rams players
Oakland Raiders players
Jacksonville Jaguars players
Washington Redskins players
Memphis Express (American football) players